Alex Sauickie (born January 25, 1971) is an American Republican Party politician who was selected on August 11, 2022, to fill a seat in the New Jersey General Assembly representing New Jersey's 12th legislative district.  That seat had been held by Ronald S. Dancer until it was vacated by his death on July 23, 2022.

A resident of Jackson Township, New Jersey, Sauickie served on the Jackson Township Council from January 9, 2019, until he was appointed to the Assembly at a special convention held on August 11, 2022.

Sauickie was elected to fill the unexpired term in the November 8, 2022, general election. The term expires on January 9, 2024, at the conclusion of the 220th New Jersey Legislature. The 221st New Jersey Legislature faces newly drawn state legislative districts by the 2022 New Jersey Apportionment Commission. The 12th Legislative District loses the municipalities of Chesterfield Township, New Hanover Township, and Wrightstown Borough, and gains Helmetta and Spotswood.

New Jersey General Assembly

Committees 
Sauickie's committee assignments for the current session are:

Agriculture and Food Security
Military and Veterans' Affairs
Tourism, Gaming and the Arts

District 12 
Each of the 40 districts in the New Jersey Legislature has one representative in the New Jersey Senate and two members in the New Jersey General Assembly. The representatives from the 12th District for the 2022—23 Legislative Session are:
 Senator Samuel D. Thompson (D)
 Assemblyman Robert D. Clifton (R)
 Assemblyman Alex Sauickie (R)

References

Living people
Republican Party members of the New Jersey General Assembly
People from Jackson Township, New Jersey
1971 births